The 1998–99 Scottish Junior Cup was the 113th staging of the Scottish Junior Cup, a competition for clubs affiliated to the Scottish Junior Football Association ("junior" in the title refers to the level of football and not the age of the players).  It was won by Kilwinning Rangers after they defeated Kelty Hearts 1–0 in the final.

First round
These ties were scheduled to take place on Saturday, TBC.

Second round
These ties were scheduled to take place on Saturday, TBC.

Third round
These ties were scheduled to take place on Saturday, TBC

Fourth round
These ties were scheduled to take place on Saturday, TBC.

Fifth round
These ties were scheduled to take place on Saturday, TBC.

Quarter finals

These ties were played on Saturday, TBC.

Semi-finals
These ties were played on Saturday, TBC.

Final
The final took place on Sunday, 30 May 1999 at Firhill Stadium, home of Partick Thistle.

Kilwinning Rangers won 1–0 with a goal from Gerry Peline only 80 seconds after the kick-off.  A number of Scottish MPs tabled an Early Day Motion in Parliament congratulating Kilwinning on winning the Junior Cup and several other trophies during the season.

References

20
Junior Cup